Pentti Kontula (4 September 1930 – 13 June 1987) was a Finnish boxer. He competed in the men's light middleweight event at the 1952 Summer Olympics.

References

External links
 

1930 births
1987 deaths
Finnish male boxers
Olympic boxers of Finland
Boxers at the 1952 Summer Olympics
People from Lohja
Light-middleweight boxers
Sportspeople from Uusimaa